Nazand Begikhani (born 1964 in Iraq) is a contemporary Kurdish/British writer, poet and leading academic researcher into gender based violence, and an active advocate of human rights. She is an honorary Senior Research Fellow at the University of Bristol, Centre for Gender and Violence Research and has been awarded the Vincent Wright Chair 2019/2020 and works as a visiting professor at Sciences Po School for International Affairs, Paris.

Begikhani was born in Kurdistan by the steps of the Zagros Mountains and has been living in Europe (Denmark, France and United Kingdom) since 1987. She received her M.A and Ph.D. in comparative literature from the Sorbonne in France, and published her first collection of poems in Paris, 1995. She has published five poetry collections in Kurdish and Bells of Speech is her first collection in English. Two of her poetry collections have been translated into French, Couleur de Sable (2011) and Le Lendemain d'Hier (2013). She has also translated works of Baudelaire and T. S. Eliot into Kurdish. Her works in English and French have been published by the Poetry Magazine, Ambit magazine, Poetry Salzburg  Review, Modern Poetry in Translation, Exiled Writers' Ink, Action Poétique, etc. Her poetry collections have been translated into many other languages, including Arabic, Persian and German.

Nazand Begikhani is also an active advocate of human rights and helped establish a number of activist-based networks, studies centers and feminist campaigns, including Kurdish Women Action against Honour Killing (KWAHK), later changed to Kurdish Women's Rights Watch (KWRW)and gender-related studies centers in Kurdistan. She has provided expert advice on honour-based violence (HBV) to a number of government bodies, including Sweden, UK and Kurdistan. Between 2007 and 2009, she sat on the board of the High Commission to Monitor Violence Against Women in Kurdistan Region and participated, as an expert witness and independent observer, in its seasonal meetings. In 2010, with colleagues from the University of Bristol, she established the pioneering Gender and Violence Studies Centre at the University of Sulaimaniya (now Gender Equality Center), a two-year project funded by the British Council. She is currently advising Kurdistan President to address higher education and gender in Kurdistan Region. She has integrated the concept of gender into Kurdistan Region's curriculum with the aim to develop feminist research and produce evidence-based knowledge on sexual and gender-based violence to inform policy and practice. Her work has had considerable influence on action and strategy to address HBV in Kurdistan. She has published academic work in Kurdish, English and French.

Nazand Begikhani has worked with the Kurdish Institute of Paris, the Kurdish Cultural Centre in London, the BBC BBC Monitoring, the University of Bristol as senior research fellow] and Le Monde Diplomatique as editor in chief of the Kurdish edition.

Nazand Begikhani has won several international prizes for her work and activities, including the UK Emma Humphreys Memorial Prize for her work combating honor crimes (2000) and French Simone Landrey's Feminine Poetry Prize (2012) for her poetry work. in 2017, she was awarded the French Honorary Citizenship by the City of Chateaux-Renault.

Poetry Works
 Yesterday of Tomorrow, Collection of Poetry, Association of Kurdish Artists in France, Paris, 1995.
 Celebrations, Collection of Poetry, Aras, Iraqi Kurdistan, 2004.
 Colour of Sand, Collection of Poetry with Dilawar Qaradaghi, Aras, Iraqi Kurdistan, 2005.
 Bells of Speech, Ambit Books Publishers, London, 64 pp., 2006. (English) 
 Bells of Speech, Collected Poems, Ranj Publishers, Sulaimaniya, 2007.(Kurdish)
 Love: An inspired Absence, Poetry Collection, Ranj Publishesrs, Sulaimaniya, 2008 
 Ranin Al-kalam, Translation of collected poems Bells of Speech into Arabic by Qays Qaradaghi and Muhammad Afif al-Hussaini, Dar Al-jamal, Lebanon, 2011
 Couleur de Sables, translation of Colour of Sand into French by Shakour Bayz and Bertrand Foly, L'Harmattan, Paris, 2011
 "Le Lendemain d'Hier". Translated by Nicole Barriere and Claude Ber with the cooperation the author, Les Amandiers, 2013.
 'A Promenade with John Donne', Ghazalnus Publishers, Tehran, 2017.
 'Oeuvres Completes of Nazand Begikhani's Poetry', Mang Publishers, Tehran, 2019. 
 
Selected books and anthologies featuring Nazand Begikhani's work:
 Hamelink Wendelmoet & Nerina Weiss, “Theorising Women and War in Kurdistan. A feminist and critical perspective”, Kurdish Studies Journal. Vol: 6, N0 1, 2018.
 With 
 With 
 Circulation of Meaning: A selection of media internviews with Nazand Begikhani, Ranj Publishers, Sulaimaniya, 2008.
 "Honour-based violence among the Kurds: The case of Iraqi Kurdistan” Honour : Crimes, Paragigms and Violence against Women", edited by Dr Lynn Welshman and Sarah Hussain, Zed Books, September 2005.
 “Here Me There” in Crossing the border: voices of refugee and exiled women, edited by Jennifer Langer, Five Leaves publications, 2002.
 “Kurdish women: A space for the self”, in The Silver Throat of the Moon: Writing in Exile", edited by Jennifer Langer, Five Leaves, 2005.
 “Modern Kurdish Poetry“, an anthology of Kurdish poetry by Kamal Mirawdali and Stephen Watts, Upsala, 2006.
 “Voice“ in Inspired Verse by Wyndham Thomas (Corsham Print, Easter 2007).
 “The war was over”, in The Poetry of Recovery by Sante Lucia Books, USA, 2007.
 “At a happiness symposium in Wales” in Fragments from the Dark by Jeni Williams & Lateafa Guemar, Hafan Books, 2008.
 “An ordinary day” in The Forward Book of Poetry by Forward Ltd in association with Faber and Faber, 2007.
 “Anfal genocide: Collective Memory and Kurdish Political Will, in  Silence and Mass Murder by Heme Kake Rash, Sardam Publishing House, April 2008.
 “After Shocks: The Poetry of Recovery for Life-Shattering Events”, by Tom Lombardo, Saint Lucia Books, Atlanta, Georgia, 2008.

References

External links
 Nazand Begikhani, Exiled Writers Ink!.
 Poetry Reading by Nazand Begikhani, British House of Commons, May 2007.
 Poetry Magazine, No.17, 2001.
 Nazand Begikhani, Start the Week, BBC Radio 4, 25 December 2006.

1964 births
Kurdish poets
University of Paris alumni
Living people
British women's rights activists
Iraqi emigrants to the United Kingdom
Iraqi expatriates in France
Iraqi expatriates in Denmark